Pseudopostega congruens is a moth of the family Opostegidae. It was described by Walsingham, Lord Thomas de Grey, in 1914. It is known from Guerrero, Mexico.

The length of the forewings is about 4.4 mm. Adults have been recorded in August.

References

Opostegidae
Moths described in 1914